The Diocese of Périgueux and Sarlat (Latin: Dioecesis Petrocoricensis et Sarlatensis; French: Diocèse de Périgueux et Sarlat) is a Latin Church ecclesiastical territory or diocese of the Catholic Church in France. Its episcopal see is Périgueux, in the département of Dordogne, in the région of Aquitaine. The Diocese of Périgueux is a suffragan diocese in the ecclesiastical province of the metropolitan Archdiocese of Bordeaux. The current bishop is Philippe Mousset, who was appointed in 2014.

History

The Martyrology of Ado gives St. Front as the first bishop of Périgueux; Saint Peter is said to have sent him to this town with the St. George to whom later traditions assign the foundation of the church of Le Puy. Subsequent biographies, which appeared between the 10th and 13th centuries, make St. Front's life one with that of St. Fronto of Nitria, thereby giving it an Egyptian colouring. At all events we know by the Chronicle of Sulpicius Severus that a Bishop of Périgueux, Paternus, was deposed for heresy about 361.

Among its bishops are:

Raymond V, Cardinal of Pons (1220–1223)
the future cardinal, Hélie de Bourdeilles (1447–1468)
Claude de Longwy, Cardinal of Givry, who was only the administrator, not the bishop, from 27 August 1540 to 27 August 1541.
the future Cardinal Gousset (1836–1840), subsequently Archbishop of Reims.

The Abbey of Saint-Sauveur of Sarlat, later placed under the patronage of St. Sacerdos of Limoges, seems to have existed before the reigns of Pepin the Short and Charlemagne who came there in pilgrimage and because of their munificence deserved to be called "founders" in a Bull of Pope Eugene III (1153). About 936 St. Odo, Abbot of Cluny, was sent to reform the abbey. The abbey was made an episcopal see by pope John XXII, on 13 January 1318.

Bishops

to 1000

 Saint Front
 Agnan
 Chronope I.
 c. 356: Paterne
 c. 380: Gavide
 c. 410: Pégase
 c. 506 – c. 533: Chronope II.
 c. 540: Sabaude
 c. 582: Chartier
 c. 590: Saffaire
 c. 629: Austier
 c. 767 – c. 778: Bertrand
 c. 805 – c. 811: Raimond I.
 c. 844: Ainard
 c. 900: Sébaude
 977–991: Frotaire
 992–1000: Martin

1000–1200

 1000–1009: Rodolphe de Coué
 1010–1036 or 1037: Arnaud de Vitabre
 c. 1037–1059: Géraud de Gourdon
 1060–1081: Guillaume I. de Montberon
 1081–1099: Renaud de Tivier
 1100–1101: Raimond II.
 1102–1129: Guillaume II. d'Auberoche
 1130–1138: Guillaume III. de Nanclars
 1138–1142: Geoffroi I. de Cauze
 1142–1147: Pierre I.
 1148–1158: Raimond III. de Mareuil
 1160–1169: Jean I. d'Assida
 1169–1182: Pierre II. Minet
 1185–1197: Adhémar I. de La Torre
 1197–1210: Raimond IV. de Châteauneuf

1200–1400

 1210–1220: Raoul I. de Lastours de Laron
 1220–1233: Cardinal Raimond de Pons
 1234–1266: Pierre III. de Saint-Astier
 1267 – c. 1280: Elie I. Pilet
 c. 1282 – c. 1295: Raimond VI. d'Auberoche
 1297 – c. 1312: Audouin
 1314–1331: Raimond VII.
 1332–1333: Giraud
 1333–1335: Pierre IV.
 1336–1340: Raimond VIII.
 1340 – c. 1346: Guillaume IV. Audibert
 1347–1348: Adhémar II.
 1349 – c. 1382: Pierre V. Pin
 1384–1385: Elie II. Servient
 1387 – c. 1400: Pierre VI. de Durfort

1400–1600

 c. 1402: Guillaume V. Lefèvre
 c. 1405: Gabriel I.
 1407–1408: Raimond IX. de Castelnau
 1408 – c. 1430: Jean II.
 1431 – c. 1436: Berenger
 1437–1438: Elie III.
 1438–1439: Pierre VII. de Durfort
 1440–1441: Raimond X.
 1441 – c. 1446: Geoffroi II. Bérenger d'Arpajon
 1447–1463: Elie IV. de Bourdeille
 1463–1470: Raoul II. du Fou (also Bishop of Angoulême)
 1470–1485: Geoffroi III. de Pompadour (also Bishop of Angoulême)
 1486–1500: Gabriel II. du Mas
 1500–1504: Geoffroi III. de Pompadour
 1504 – c. 1510: Jean III. Auriens
 1510–1522: Gui I. de Castelnau
 1522–1524: Jacques de Castelnau
 1524–1532: Jean de Plas
 1532–1540: Foucaud de Bonneval
 1540–1541: Claude de Longwy, Cardinal de Givry
 1541–1547 Agostino Trivulzio, administrator
 1548–1550: Jean de Lustrac
 1551–1552: Geoffroi de Pompadour
 1554–1560: Gui II. Bouchard d'Aubeterre
 1561–1575: Pierre VIII. Fournier
 1578–1600: François I. de Bourdeille

1600–1800

 1600–1612: Jean VI. Martin
 1614–1646: François II. de La Béraudière
 1646: Jean VII. d'Estrades
 1646–1652: Philibert de Brandon
 1654–1665: Cyr de Villers-la-Faye
 1666–1693: Guillaume VI. Le Boux
 1693–1702: Daniel de Francheville
 1702–1719: Pierre IX. Clément
 1721–1731: Michel-Pierre d'Argouges
 1731–1771: Jean VIII. Chrétien de Macheco de Prémeaux
 1771–1773: Gabriel III. Louis de Rougé
 1773–1790: Emmanuel-Louis de Grossoles de Flamarens
 1791–1793: Pontaud

from 1800

 1817–1836: Alexandre-Charles-Louis-Rose de Lostanges-Saint-Alvère
 1835–1840: Thomas-Marie-Joseph Gousset (also Archbishop of Reims)
 1840–1860: Jean-Baptiste-Amédée Georges-Massonnais
 1861–1863: Charles-Théodore Baudry
 1863–1901: Nicolas-Joseph Dabert
 1901–1906: François-Marie-Joseph Delamaire
 1906–1915: Henri-Louis-Prosper Bougoin
 1915–1920: Maurice-Louis-Marie Rivière
 1920–1931: Christophe-Louis Légasse
 1932–1965: Georges-Auguste Louis
 1965–1988: Jacques-Julien-Émile Patria
 1988–2004: Gaston Élie Poulain, P.S.S.
 2004–2014: Michel Pierre Marie Mouïsse
 2014–present: Philippe Mousset

References

Bibliography

Reference books

  p. 397-398. (in Latin)
 pp. 215.
 p. 272.
 p. 277.
 pp. 311–312.
 p. 334.

Studies

External links
  Centre national des Archives de l'Église de France, L’Épiscopat francais depuis 1919, retrieved: 2016-12-24.

Roman Catholic dioceses in France